Severin Kiefer (born 11 October 1990) is a retired Austrian figure skater. He is a ten-time Austrian national pairs champion (2011–13 with Stina Martini; 2014–2016, 2018, and 2020–22 with Miriam Ziegler) and a three-time national bronze medalist (2012–14) in men's singles. He and Ziegler have represented Austria at the 2014, 2018 and 2022 Winter Olympics.

Programs

With Ziegler

With Martini

Singles career

Competitive highlights 
GP: Grand Prix; CS: Challenger Series; JGP: Junior Grand Prix

With Ziegler

With Martini

Singles career

References

External links 

 
 
 

Austrian male single skaters
Austrian male pair skaters
1990 births
Living people
Figure skaters at the 2014 Winter Olympics
Figure skaters at the 2018 Winter Olympics
Figure skaters at the 2022 Winter Olympics
Olympic figure skaters of Austria
People from Hallein District
Sportspeople from Salzburg (state)
Competitors at the 2013 Winter Universiade